is a 2005 Japanese psychological horror film, and a prequel to the independent horror film Suicide Club (2002), written and directed by Sion Sono.

Suicide Club concerns the mass suicide of 54 schoolgirls and how it leads the law to a shadowy cult. Noriko's Dinner Table takes place before, during, and after the previous installment's timeline as an attempt to resolve several questions left unanswered.

Noriko's Dinner Table explores various issues including the generation gap in modern families, the malleability of personal identity, social alienation, suicide, and the use of the Internet.

The film was released theatrically in Japan on September 23, 2006. It received special mention at the 40th Karlovy Vary International Film Festival.

Plot
The film is divided into 5 chapters, the first four of which are named after characters in the film: Noriko, Yuka, Kumiko and Tetsuzo, in that order. The plot is told non-linearly and shifts between the perspectives of Noriko, Yuka and Tetsuzo.

A shy and demure 17-year-old girl named Noriko Shimabara (Kazue Fukiishi) lives with her quiet family, formed by her sister Yuka (Yuriko Yoshitaka), her mother Taeko (Sanae Miyata), and her father Tetsuzo (Ken Mitsuishi), in Toyokawa, Japan. Noriko finds her small-town life unsatisfying and craves to move to Tokyo, assuming she would live a more active life there. This sentiment is especially encouraged when she finds that her elementary school friend Tangerine (Yoko Mitsuya) is now working independently as an idol. Noriko's father is strictly against her going to the city, and plans on having her join a local university after school.

Feeling alienated and misunderstood by her parents, Noriko resorts to the internet where she finds Haikyo.com, a website where other teenagers from Japan gather. There, after making new and unknown friends, she feels truly at "home" and eventually, on December 10, 2001, runs away from her unhappy life to Tokyo, where she plans on meeting the website's leader, a mysterious girl who uses the screen name "Ueno Station 54". Once in Tokyo, Noriko logs onto the website and contacts Ueno54. They meet up at Locker #54 in Ueno Train Station, where it is revealed that she is a young woman named Kumiko. Kumiko introduces Noriko to her family and takes her to visit her grandparents. As it turns out, however, Kumiko has no real family, and the people she introduced Noriko to are paid actors working for Kumiko's organisation, I.C. Corp. The organisation offers paid rental family services to interested clients, allowing them to fulfill their fantasy of a happy family life.

Six months later, 54 girls jump in front of a train at Shinjuku station and commit suicide while Noriko and Kumiko look on. It is implied that the 54 were members of the organization acting out their roles. Back in Toyokawa, Yuka, who was also a member of Haikyo.com, wonders if her sister was involved in the mass suicide. She writes a story speculating how her father would react if she were to disappear as well, and deliberately leaves clues before running off to Tokyo to join I.C. Corp.

Tetsuzo attempts to put on a brave face after Yuka's disappearance, but his wife Taeko's mental condition deteriorates rapidly and she eventually commits suicide. Meanwhile, Tetsuzo, a reporter, gathers clues regarding his daughters' disappearances and discovers Yuka's story. He is crushed to find that his daughter could predict his actions and behaviour so accurately while he was completely unaware of his daughters' feelings. His investigations reveal Haikyo.com and taking a cue from sensationalist media tabloids, he concludes that his daughters are part of a cult called the "Suicide Club".

Tetsuzo contacts a member of I.C. Corp, who refutes the existence of a "suicide club" and instead expounds on a concept of social roles that forms the basis of his organisation. Tetsuzo gets an old friend of his, Ikeda (Shirou Namiki) to pose as a client for I.C. Corp and rent Kumiko as his wife, and Noriko and Yuka as his daughters (who go by the aliases Mitsuko and Yoko respectively). Tetsuzo finds a house in Tokyo resembling his own and moves all the furniture from the old house to the new one so that it will resemble it exactly. Mitsuko and Yoko are unsettled when they arrive at the house, but they fall back into their roles when prompted by Kumiko. Ikeda sends Kumiko away on an errand and Tetsuzo reveals himself. The girls, however, treat him as a stranger and insist that they are Mitsuko and Yoko, not Noriko and Yuka.

As the session falls apart, thugs from the organisation arrive on site to beat up Tetsuzo, who attacks them with a knife and kills all of them in the living room. Kumiko arrives from her errand shortly thereafter, playing out her role as if nothing is wrong, but then imploring Tetsuzo to kill her and run away with Noriko and Yuka. Her insistence gravely disturbs Noriko and Yuka, before Yuka interrupts the heated conversation and asks to 'extend the session'.

Finally, Tetsuzo, Kumiko, Mitsuko and Yuka dine together as a happy family and Tetsuzo begins acting as if Kumiko is his wife, calling her Taeko. Yuka does not sleep that night and leaves the home at the crack of dawn, shedding her role and name. Mitsuko awakens shortly thereafter and, speaking to herself, bids goodbye to Yuka, adolescence, Haikyo.com and Mitsuko, before finally declaring that she is Noriko.

By the end of the film, two years have passed, including eighteen months since the mass suicide.

Cast
 Kazue Fukiishi as Noriko Shimabara/Mitsuko
 Ken Mitsuishi as Tetsuzo Shimabara
 Yuriko Yoshitaka as Yuka Shimabara/Yōko
 Tsugumi as Kumiko/Ueno54
 Sanae Miyata as Taeko Shimabara
 Shirō Namiki as Ikeda
 Yōko Mitsuya as Tangerine
 Tamae Andō as Broken Dam
 Chihiro Abe as Long Neck
 Hanako Onuki as Midnight
 Naoko Watanabe as Cripple
 Hiroshi Sakuma

Novel
Suicide Circle: The Complete Edition was written by Sion Sono in April 2002. This book was a draft of sorts for Noriko's Dinner Table, according to Sono. The story of The Complete Edition deals with both the events of this film and those of Suicide Club. So far, no plans for an English edition have appeared.

References

External links
 
 
 

2005 films
2005 drama films
2005 horror films
Japanese drama films
Japanese horror films
2000s Japanese-language films
Films directed by Sion Sono
Films about dysfunctional families
Films about suicide
Films based on Japanese novels
Films set in Tokyo
Films shot in Tokyo
Japanese independent films
Works about nihilism
Japanese psychological horror films
2000s Japanese films